Gojoseon, also called Joseon, was the first kingdom on the Korean Peninsula. According to Korean mythology, the kingdom was established by the legendary founder named Dangun. Gojoseon possessed the most advanced culture in the Korean Peninsula at the time and was an important marker in the progression towards the more centralized states of later periods. The addition of Go, meaning "ancient", is used in historiography to distinguish the kingdom from the Joseon dynasty founded in 1392 CE.

According to the Memorabilia of the Three Kingdoms, Gojoseon was established in 2333 BCE by Dangun, who was said to be born between a heavenly prince Hwanung and a bear-woman Ungnyeo. While Dangun is a mythological figure from the legends for whom no concrete evidences have been found so far, some interpret the legend of Dangun as the reflections of the sociocultural situations involving the kingdom's early developments.  Regardless, the account of Dangun has played an important role in the development of Korean identity. Today, the founding date of Gojoseon is officially celebrated as National Foundation Day in North Korea and South Korea.

Some of the sources claim that later in the 12th century BCE following the establishment of Gojoseon, Jizi (also known as Gija), a sage who belonged to the royal family from the Shang dynasty, immigrated to the northern part of the Korean Peninsula and became the founder of Gija Joseon. There are many interpretations of Gojoseon and Gija Joseon, as well as the debates regarding Gija Joseon's existence.

In 194 BCE, the ruling dynasty of Gojoseon was overthrown by Wi Man (Wei Man in Chinese), a refugee from the Han vassal state of Yan. Wi Man then established Wiman Joseon.

In 108 BC, the Han dynasty, under Emperor Wu, invaded and conquered Wiman Joseon. The Han established four commanderies to administrate the former Gojoseon territory. After the fragmentation of the Han Empire during the 3rd century and the subsequent chaotic 4th century, the area was lost from Chinese control and conquered by Goguryeo in 313 CE.

The capital of Gojoseon was Wanggeom (modern Pyongyang) from at least in the 2nd century BCE. In the southern region of the Korean Peninsula, the Jin state arose by the 3rd century BCE.

Founding myths

There are three different main founding myths concerning Gojoseon, which revolve around Dangun, Gija, or Wi Man.

Dangun myth

The myths revolving around Dangun were recorded in the later Korean work Samguk Yusa (삼국유사) of the 13th century. This work states that Dangun, the offspring of a heavenly prince and a bear-woman, founded Gojoseon in 2333 BC, and was succeeded by Gija (Qizi) after King Wu of Zhou had placed him onto the throne in 1122 BC. A similar account is found in Jewang Ungi. According to the legend, the Lord of Heaven, Hwanin had a son, Hwanung, who descended to Baekdu Mountain and founded the city of Shinsi. Then a bear and a tiger came to Hwanung and said that they wanted to become people. Hwanung said to them that if they went in a cave and lived there for 100 days while only eating mugwort and garlic he would change them into human beings. However, about halfway through the 100 days the tiger gave up and ran out of the cave. The bear, in contrast, successfully restrained herself and became a beautiful woman named Ungnyeo (웅녀, 熊女). Hwanung later married Ungnyeo, and she gave birth to Dangun.

While the Dangun story is considered to be a myth, it is believed it is a mythical synthesis of a series of historical events relating to the founding of Gojoseon. There are various theories on the origin of this myth. Seo and Kang (2002) believe the Dangun myth is based on integration of two different tribes, an invasive sky-worshipping Bronze Age tribe and a native bear-worshipping neolithic tribe, that led to the foundation of Gojoseon. Lee K. B. (1984) believes 'Dangun-wanggeom' was a title borne by successive leaders of Gojoseon.

Dangun is said to have founded Gojoseon around 2333 BC, based on the descriptions of the Samgungnyusa, Jewang Ungi, Dongguk Tonggam and the Annals of the Joseon Dynasty. The date differs among historical sources, although all of them put it during the mythical Emperor Yao's reign (traditional dates: 2357 BC? – 2256 BC?). Samgungnyusa says Dangun ascended to the throne in the 50th year of the legendary Yao's reign, Annals of the King Sejong says the first year, and Dongguk Tonggam says the 25th year.

In the 7th century BCE, the Yan pioneered the Northeast regions. According to The Growth of Yan and The Context of Guanzi, it can be presumed that Gojoseon grew through trade in this era. It is estimated that Gojoseon developed so far as to be able to war against the Yan in the 4th century BCE.

Gija myth

Gija, a man from the period of the Shang dynasty, allegedly fled to the Korean peninsula in 1122 BC during the fall of the Shang to the Zhou dynasty and founded Gija Joseon. Gija Joseon is recognized and mentioned in the earliest surviving Chinese record, Records of the Three Kingdoms. Gija's story was further developed in later Korean texts such as Samguk yusa and Jewang ungi. By the middle of Goryeo dynasty, a state cult had developed around Gija. The Dongsa Gangmok of 1778 described Gija's activities and contributions in Gojoseon. The records of Gija refer to Eight Prohibitions, that are recorded by the Book of Han and evidence a hierarchical society with legal protections of private property.

In pre-modern Korea, Gija represented the authenticating presence of Chinese civilization. Until the 12th century CE, Koreans commonly believed that Dangun bestowed upon Korea its people and basic culture, while Gija gave Korea its high culture, and presumably, standing as a legitimate civilisation.

Many modern experts have denied Gija Joseon's existence for various reasons, mainly due to contradicting archaeological evidence and anachronistic historical evidence. They point to the Bamboo Annals and the Analects of Confucius, which were among the first works to mention Gija, but do not mention his migration to Gojoseon. Gija Joseon might have just existed as a symbol of the pre-Qin dynasty migrants who escaped the chaos of the Warring States period.

Wi Man
Wi Man was a military officer of the Yan of northeastern China who fled to the northern Korean peninsula in 195 BCE from the encroaching Han dynasty. He founded a principality with Wanggeom-seong as its capital, which is thought to be in the region of present-day Pyongyang. The 3rd-century Chinese text Weilüe of the Sanguozhi recorded that Wi Man usurped King Jun and thus took over the kingship of Gojoseon.

Academic perspectives

Gojoseon mythology and history can be divided into three phases, Dangun, Gija Joseon, and Wi Man Joseon.

 Kang & Macmillan (1980), Sohn et al. (1970), Kim J.B. (1980), Han W.K. (1970), Yun N. H. (1985), Lee K.B. (1984), Lee J.B. (1987) viewed the Dangun myth as a native product of proto-Koreans, although it is not always associated with Gojoseon. Kim J.B. (1987) rejected the Dangun myth's association with Gojoseon and pushes it further back to the Neolithic period. Sohn et al. (1970) suggested that the Dangun myth is associated with the Dongyi, whom they viewed as the ancestors of Koreans. Kim C. (1948) suggested the Dangun myth had a Chinese origin, tracing it to a Han Dynasty tomb in the Shandong peninsula.
 Gardiner (1969), Henderson (1959), McCune (1962) considered the Gija myth to be a later conflation. Sohn et al. (1970) dismissed the Gija story as a Chinese fabrication. On the other hand, Hatada (1969), gave Gojoseon a Chinese identity, exclusively ascribed it to the Gija myth, and moved it to the 3rd century BCE. Shim Jae-Hoon (2002) accepted the eastward migration of Gija, but denied the relationship between Gija and Joseon, suggesting that the existence of Gojoseon could not be extended to the second millennium BCE.
 Kim C.W. (1966), Han W.K. (1970), Choi M.L. (1983, 1984, 1985, 1992), Han W.K. (1984), Kim J.B. (1987), Lee K.B. (1984) accepted Wi Man as a historical figure. Gardiner (1969) questioned authenticity of the Wi Man myth, although he mentioned there were interactions between Gojoseon and the Han Dynasty and social unrest in the area during that time period.

Controversies
Around the mid-Joseon Dynasty, the established view among historians traced Korean origins to Chinese refugees, considering Korean history that of a long series of kingdoms connected with China. As such, the Gija Joseon and Silla states were valorized, while the Gojoseon and Goguryeo states were not considered as important. According to this view, the first state in Korea, Gija Joseon, was founded by Jizi in 1122 BCE, who was a disgruntled Chinese advisor to the Shang Dynasty. The story of how he brought poetry, music, medicine, trade, and a political system to the Korean peninsula was conceived similarly to the proposed Founding of Rome by the Trojan refugee Aeneas. But by the 1930s, under the influence of Shin Chaeho's histories, the Jizi Korean founding story became less popular than that of Dangun, the son of a tiger and a bear – the latter being common in Japanese folklore – who brought civilization to the Korean peninsula. Shin and the other historians who promulgated this myth had been influenced by Daejonggyo, a new religious movement which worshipped Dangun, but attacked pre-annexation textbook narratives of Dangun which portrayed him as the brother of the Japanese god Susanoo. To Shin, Dangun was both the founder of the Korean minjok and the first Korean state (kuk), and thus the necessary starting point for Korean history. In response to a challenge by the Japanese scholars Shiratori Kurakichi and Imanishi Ryū of Dangun as a fabrication by the author of the Samguk yusa, nationalist historian Choe Nam-seon attacked Japanese mythology as being built upon fabrications.

By focusing on a mythological god which founded a "sacred race" (shinsŏng chongjok), Korean nationalist historiography aims to portray ancient Korea as a golden age of "gods and heroes" where Korea's cultural achievements rivaled those of China and Japan. Accordingly, Shin Chaeho elevated Dangun to play a similar role as did the Yellow Emperor in China and which Amaterasu does in Japan. Choe Nam-seon, according to his Purham culture theory, places Dangun even above the Chinese and Japanese emperors, because those rulers were supposedly Shamanistic rulers of the ancient Korean "Părk" tradition. The Dangun story also lends credence to claims that Korean heritage is over 5000 years old. According to Hyung Il Pai, the popularity of Dangun studies can be said to "reflect the progressively ultra-nationalistic trend in Korean historical and archaeological scholarship today". Shin Chaeho named Mount Paektu in the Changbai Mountains on the Sino-Korean border as a part of Korean heritage, by virtue of connection with the mythical Dangun. The mountain, however, was also claimed by the Manchus of the Qing Dynasty as part of their origin myth at least since the 17th century, and the mountain range is considered sacred in Han Chinese culture as well. This nationalist identification of Baekdu with Koreans was cemented by the operation of Korean independence movement partisans operating from the Chinese border and legitimized with associations to the history of the Gojoseon and Balhae states. The Chinese civilizational connection to ancient Korea continues to be attacked by North Korean historians, who allege that the history of Gija Joseon was "viciously distorted by the feudal ruling class, the sadaejuui followers, and the big-power chauvinists".

State formation

The first mentions of Gojoseon are found in historical records of Guanzi. It locates Gojoseon around Bohai Bay and mentions the state trading with Qi (齊) of China. The Zhanguoce, Shanhaijing, and Shiji—containing some of its earliest records—refers to Joseon as a region, until the text Shiji began referring it as a country from 195 BC onwards.

By the 4th century BCE, other states with defined political structures developed in the areas of the earlier Bronze Age "walled-town states"; Gojoseon was the most advanced of them in the peninsular region. The city-state expanded by incorporating other neighboring city-states by alliance or military conquest. Thus, a vast confederation of political entities between the Taedong and Liao rivers was formed. As Gojoseon evolved, so did the title and function of its leader, who came to be designated as "king" (Han), in the tradition of the Zhou dynasty, around the same time as the Yan (燕) leader. Records of that time mention the hostility between the feudal state in Northern China and the "confederated" kingdom of Gojoseon. Notably, a plan to attack the Yan beyond the Liao River frontier is recorded. This confrontation led to the decline and eventual downfall of Gojoseon, described in Yan records as "arrogant" and "cruel". But the ancient kingdom also appears as a prosperous Bronze Age civilization with a complex social structure, including a class of horse-riding warriors who contributed to the development of Gojoseon and its northern expansion into most of the Liaodong basin.

Around 300 BCE, Gojoseon lost significant western territory after a war with the Yan state, but this indicates Gojoseon was already a large enough state that it could wage war against Yan and survive the loss of 2000 li (800 kilometers) of territory. Gojoseon is thought to have relocated its capital to the Pyongyang region around this time.

Wiman Joseon and Its Fall

In 195 BCE, King Jun appointed a refugee from Yan, Wi Man, to guard the frontier. Wi Man later rebelled in 194 BC and usurped the throne of Gojoseon. King Jun fled to Jin in the south of the Korean Peninsula.

In 109 BCE, Emperor Wu of Han invaded near the Liao River. A conflict would erupt in 109 BCE, when Wi Man's grandson King Ugeo (우거왕) refused to let Jin's ambassadors through his territory in order to reach the Han dynasty. King Ugeo refused and had his son, Prince Wi Jang (長降) escort the ambassador back home. However, when they got close to Han's borders, the ambassador assassinated Wi Jang (長降) and claimed to Emperor Wu that he had defeated Joseon in battle. Emperor Wu, unaware of this deception, made him the military commander of the Commandery of Liaodong. The outraged King Ugeo made a raid on Liaodong and killed She He. Scholars also hypothesize that the initiation of war may also have been because the Han Dynasty was concerned that Gojoseon would ally with the Xiongnu against the Han.

In response, Emperor Wu commissioned a two-pronged attack, one by land and one by sea, against Gojoseon. The two forces attacking Gojoseon were unable to coordinate well with each other and suffered large losses. Eventually, the commands were merged, and Wanggeom fell in 108 BCE. Han took over the Gojoseon lands and established Four Commanderies of Han in the western part of former Gojoseon.

Gojoseon disintegrated by the 1st century BCE as it gradually lost the control of its former fiefs. Many successor states sprang from its former territory, such as Buyeo, Okjeo, Dongye. Goguryeo and Baekje arose out from Buyeo.

Culture
Around 2000 BCE, a new pottery culture of painted and chiseled design was developed. These people practiced agriculture in a settled communal life, probably organized into familial clans. Rectangular huts and increasingly larger dolmen burial sites were found throughout the peninsula. Bronze daggers and mirrors have been excavated, and there is archaeological evidence of small walled-town states in this period. Dolmens and bronze daggers found in the area are uniquely Korean and cannot be found in China. A few dolmens are found in China, mostly in the Shandong province.

Mumun Pottery
In the Mumun pottery period (1500 – 300 BCE), plain coarse pottery replaced earlier comb-pattern wares, possibly as a result of the influence of new populations migrating to Korea from Manchuria and Siberia. This type of pottery typically has thicker walls and displays a wider variety of shapes, indicating improvements in kiln technology. This period is sometimes called the "Korean Bronze Age", but bronze artifacts are relatively rare and regionalized until the 7th century BCE.

Rice cultivation was extensive in the lower parts of South Korea and Manchuria in the periods between 1900 BCE to 200 CE.

Bronze Tools

The beginning of the Bronze Age on the peninsula is usually said to be 1000 BCE, but estimates range from the 13th to 8th centuries BCE. Although the Korean Bronze Age culture derives from the Liaoning and Manchuria, it exhibits unique typology and styles, especially in ritual objects.

By the 7th century BCE, a Bronze Age material culture with influences from Manchuria, eastern Mongolia, as well as Siberia and Scythian bronze styles, flourished on the peninsula. Korean bronzes contain a higher percentage of zinc than those of the neighboring bronze cultures. Bronze artifacts, found most frequently in burial sites, consist mainly of swords, spears, daggers, small bells, and mirrors decorated with geometric patterns.

Gojoseon's development seems linked to the adoption of bronze technology. Its singularity finds its most notable expression in the idiosyncratic type of bronze swords, or "mandolin-shaped daggers" (비파형동검, 琵琶形銅劍). The mandolin-shape dagger is found in the regions of Liaoning, Hebei, and Manchuria down to the Korean Peninsula. It suggests the existence of Gojoseon dominions. Remarkably, the shape of the "mandolin" dagger of Gojoseon differs significantly from the sword artifacts found in China.

Tombs

Dolmen Tombs
Megalithic dolmens appear in Korean peninsula and Manchuria around 2000 BCE to 400 BCE. Around 900 BCE, burial practices become more elaborate, a reflection of increasing social stratification. Goindol, the dolmen tombs in Korea and Manchuria, comprising upright stones supporting a horizontal slab, are more numerous in Korea than in other parts of East Asia. Other new forms of burial are stone cists (underground burial chambers lined with stone) and earthenware jar coffins. The bronze objects, pottery, and jade ornaments recovered from dolmens and stone cists indicate that such tombs were reserved for the elite class.

Around the 6th century BCE, burnished red wares, made of a fine iron-rich clay and characterized by a smooth, lustrous surface, appear in dolmen tombs, as well as in domestic bowls and cups.

Other types of tombs
In 1964, through a joint excavation by China and North Korea, Gangsang tomb(강상무덤, 崗上墓) and Nusang tomb(누상무덤, 樓上墓) were found in 1964 at the Liaodong peninsula. Nusang was found earlier prior to the excavation in 1958 Gangsang and Nusang tombs are considered to be burial cairn tombs of local nobilities of Gojoseon. Some consider the tombs as the evidences of the slavery that could have existed, but others find that the evidences are inadequate and lacking to deduce such conclusion.

Iron Culture

Around this time, the state of Jin occupied the southern part of the Korean peninsula. Very little is known about this state except that it was the apparent predecessor to the Samhan confederacies.

Around 300 BCE, iron technology was introduced into Korea from Yan state. Iron was produced locally in the southern part of the peninsula by the 2nd century BCE. According to Chinese accounts, iron from the lower Nakdong River in the southeast was valued throughout the peninsula and Japan.

Poetry
In the book of Gogeumju(古今注) written by Cui Bao(崔豹) of the Western Jin period, poetry called Gonghuyin(箜篌引) or Gongmudohaga(公無渡河歌) is said to be of Gojoseon origin. 
The poetry is as follows:

公無渡河     "Don't cross the river, my love."

公竟渡河     "My love eventually crossed the river.'

墮河而死     "Now that my love is drowned,"

當奈公何     "There's nothing that I can do."

Proto–Three Kingdoms of Korea

Numerous small states and confederations arose from the remnants of Gojoseon, including Goguryeo, the Buyeo kingdom, Okjeo, and Dongye. Three of the Chinese commanderies fell to local resistance within a few decades, but the last, Nakrang, remained an important commercial and cultural outpost until it was destroyed by the expanding Goguryeo in 313 CE.

Jun of Gojoseon is said to have fled to the state of Jin in the southern Korean Peninsula. Jin developed into the Samhan confederacies, the beginnings of Baekje and Silla, continuing to absorb migration from the north. The Samhan confederacies were Mahan, Jinhan, and Byeonhan. King Jun ruled Mahan, which was eventually annexed by Baekje. Goguryeo, Baekje, and Silla gradually grew into the Three Kingdoms of Korea that dominated the entire peninsula by around the 4th century.

See also
 Names of Korea
 History of Korea
 Three Confederate States of Gojoseon

Notes

Bibliography

 
Former countries in Korean history
History of Manchuria